Diogo Fernandes (born 15 December 1985) is a Brazilian footballer.

Biography 
Diogo Fernandes signed for Bacabal of Taça Cidade de São Luís in January 2008 (Campeonato Maranhense started in second half of calendar year, unlike other states). The team then qualified for Campeonato Brasileiro Série C 2008, but Diogo did not play in the national league.

In August 2008, he signed a 1-year contract with Portuguese Liga de Honra side Boavista F.C., wore number 77 shirt. Mainly a substitute, he scored 2 league goals for the Porto side.

After Boavista relegated, he joined Ituiutaba which the team recently exited the Campeonato Série C and was preparing for Taça Minas Gerais. He was released after the last group match of the Cup, as the team failed to qualified for the next round.

In December 2009, he signed a contract with Red Bull Brasil until the end of 2010 Campeonato Paulista Série A3.

Honours 
 Taça Cidade de São Luís: 2008
 Campeonato Paulista Série A3: 2010

References

External links 
 
 
 Profile at Portuguese Liga 
 Profile at CBF 

Brazilian footballers
Brazilian expatriate footballers
C.D. Social Sol players
F.C. Motagua players
C.D. Victoria players
Boavista F.C. players
Bryne FK players
Association football midfielders
Expatriate footballers in Honduras
Expatriate footballers in Portugal
Expatriate footballers in Norway
Brazilian expatriate sportspeople in Honduras
Brazilian expatriate sportspeople in Portugal
Liga Nacional de Fútbol Profesional de Honduras players
Norwegian First Division players
1985 births
Living people
People from Barueri